Kirkwall is the largest town in Orkney, an archipelago to the north of mainland Scotland.

The name Kirkwall comes from the Norse name  (Church Bay), which later changed to Kirkvoe, Kirkwaa and Kirkwall. Kirkwall was formerly the site of an ancient Norse town founded approximately 1000 years ago. Today, it is a transport hub with ferries to many locations.

History
In 1486, King James III of Scotland elevated Kirkwall to the status of a royal burgh.
On the western edge of the town, surrounded by Hatston Industrial Estate, there is a prehistoric monument, known as the "Grain Earth House" (see Historic Scotland). It is a short, low, stone-walled passage, deep underground, leading to a small pillared chamber. This kind of earth house (or "souterrain") is characteristic of the Northern Isles (although the Grain Earth House is unusually deep below ground). It was originally connected to a surface dwelling, which has since disappeared. The purpose of these Iron Age structures remains unknown. Further west, towards Grimbister, there is a similar structure, known as Rennibister Earth House.

Governance
Kirkwall is the administrative centre of Orkney, and the site of the headquarters of both Orkney Islands Council and NHS Orkney.

From 1708 to 1918, Kirkwall was a parliamentary burgh, and was combined with Dingwall, Dornoch, Tain and Wick to form the Northern Burghs constituency of the House of Commons of the Parliament of Great Britain (1708–1801) and then of the Parliament of the United Kingdom (1801–1918). (Cromarty was added to this constituency in 1832.) The constituency was a district of burghs known as the Tain Burghs until 1832, and then as the Wick Burghs. It was represented by one Member of Parliament (MP) until 1918, when the constituency was abolished and Kirkwall was merged politically into the county constituency of Orkney and Shetland. Although sometimes referred to as "The City and Royal Burgh of Kirkwall", Kirkwall is not technically a city. (See city status in the United Kingdom.)

In the 1784–85 term, the well-known outspoken Liberal Charles James Fox represented Tain in the British Parliament. His political opponents fiercely objected to his having been elected from his usual constituency, Westminster; the unlikely resolution of this dispute was that Fox was made a burgess of Kirkwall.

Geography
It is situated on the northern coast of Mainland, Orkney, with its harbours in the bay of Kirkwall to the north, and with Scapa Flow  to the south. Its parish, St Ola, forms the isthmus between Firth and Holm.
It is the most populous island settlement in Scotland.

Climate
Kirkwall has an oceanic climate (Cfb), with a strong maritime influence on its temperature. As a result, it is generally cooler than the rest of the UK in the summer (except that tends to be warmer than Shetland, being closer to mainland Scotland).

Demography
The population of Kirkwall is continuously on the rise. The population was predicted to be about 10,000 in 2018.

Economy
There is a Marina, and support for fishing and dive vessels. After extensive work on harbour facilities, the town has become a popular cruise ship stop, with several ships arriving each week in the season. This has added to the prosperity of the town and allowed a thriving sector of independently owned shops. Each year now, 140 cruise ships visit Kirkwall and Stromness.

Weaving in Orkney took place from Viking times, with John Sclater & Co involved in Tweed production in Kirkwall in the 1970s. They used the brand names Norsaga and Jarltex.

Culture and community

The Orkney Library and Archive is in Kirkwall. Kirkwall also has the most northerly of the world's Carnegie libraries, which was opened by Andrew Carnegie and his wife in 1909. The building survives, although the library has since moved to a larger building on Junction Road which opened in August 2003.

The town has two museums, the larger being The Orkney Museum in Tankerness House, which contains items of local historical interest within one of Scotland's best-preserved 16th-century town-houses. It is a Category A listed building Scotland. The prehistoric, Pictish and Viking collections are of international importance. The other museum is the Orkney Wireless Museum, dealing with the history of radio and recorded sound.

There is a Royal National Lifeboat Institution lifeboat station.

One of the major annual events in the town is the Ba Game, held each Christmas Day and New Year's Day between the Uppies and the Doonies, each team representing one half of the town.

Media and the arts
The composer Peter Maxwell Davies was among a group which founded the annual St Magnus International Festival which is centred on Kirkwall each midsummer.

Orkney Theatre, a 384-seat venue, was opened in 2014 next to Kirkwall Grammar School in The Meadows. It has an orchestra pit which can be made available for use by removing two rows of seats.

Kirkwall Harbour can be seen in The Highlands and Islands – A Royal Tour, a 1973 documentary about Prince Charles' visit to the Highlands and Islands, directed by Oscar Marzaroli.
Scottish film-maker Margaret Tait was born in Kirkwall, and many of her films (in particular the Aspects of Kirkwall series) are set there.

Long-running The Simpsons character Groundskeeper Willie was born in Kirkwall.

Landmarks

Kirkwall has many 17th–18th-century houses and other structures in the local vernacular style. Kirkwall Town Hall was completed in 1884.

Transport
Kirkwall is a port with ferry services to Aberdeen and Lerwick, as well as the principal north islands in the group. Hatson pier, the main ferry terminal, is some  outside the town centre.

The Aberdeen, Leith, Clyde & Tay Shipping Company operated steamer services to Kirkwall from 1836, with successor companies operating until 2002.

There are no passenger rail services in Kirkwall, the nearby railways having been industrial or military.

Education

Nursery schools
 Glaitness Nursery
 Papdale Nursery
 Peedie Breeks Nursery (closed 2020)
 Strynd Nursery
 Willow Tree Nursery

Primary schools
 Aurrida School
 Glaitness Primary School
 Papdale Primary School

Secondary schools
 Kirkwall Grammar School

Colleges and universities
 Orkney College UHI
 Institute of Northern Studies

The oldest school in Kirkwall, Kirkwall Grammar School, has been established since circa 1200. The current school building was opened in 2014.

The Orkney College main campus is situated in Kirkwall, in a purpose-built building that opened in 2000.

Religious sites

The 'Kirk' of Kirkwall was not the Cathedral (which was originally at Birsay), but the 11th-century church of Saint Olaf of Norway. One late medieval doorway survives from this church, and an aumbry from the original church survives within the late 19th-century structure of the present-day Saint Olaf's Church (Episcopal) in the town's Dundas Crescent. At the heart of the town stands St Magnus Cathedral, which was founded in memory of Saint Magnus Erlendsson, Earl of Orkney 1108–1117 by Earl (later Saint) Rögnvald Kali. Next to the Cathedral are the ruins of the former Bishop's Palace and Earl's Palace.

Sport
The Pickaquoy Centre, Orkney's largest leisure centre, is located in Kirkwall, which opened in 1999.

Kirkwall Grammar School Sports Centre has indoor sports facilities, and grass and synthetic pitches, available to the public.

Twin town – sister city
Kirkwall is twinned with:

Moena, Trentino-Alto Adige/Südtirol (since 1996)

Notable people
 Conran of Orkney, 7th-century Bishop of the Orkneys
 Stanley Cursiter, Painter and Limner, was born in East Road
 Ola Gorie, jewellery designer 
 Peter Marshall was educated in Kirkwall
 Clara Anne Williams (née Rendall), born Kirkwall 24 July 1887, missionary, teacher, and wife of Rev. Aeneas Francon Williams was awarded the Kaisar-i-Hind medal in 1946 for her work during WWII being in-charge of Red Cross work in Dooars, Bengal, India.

Notes

References

External links

Orkneyjar – The Royal Burgh of Kirkwall
Listen to recordings of a speaker of Kirkwall Scots

 
Fishing communities in Scotland
Port cities and towns in Scotland
Port cities and towns of the North Sea
County towns in Scotland
Towns in Orkney
Towns with cathedrals in the United Kingdom
Viking Age populated places
Mainland, Orkney